Parliamentary elections were held in Iceland on 8 April 1995. They were the first elections after the Althing became a unicameral parliament in 1991. The Independence Party remained the largest party, winning 25 of the 63 seats. The coalition government of the Independence Party and Progressive Party remained in office, with Davíð Oddsson continuing as Prime Minister.

Electoral system changes 
Compared to prior elections where eight seats were to be allocated to the constituencies before the election in order to reflect population and one seat could be allocated after the election, all seats were allocated before the election to constituencies.

Results

References

Iceland
Parliamentary election
Parliamentary elections in Iceland
Iceland